Michael J. Finn is an American politician who represents the 6th Hampden District in the Massachusetts House of Representatives and was member of the West Springfield City Council from 2004 to 2011.

See also
 2019–2020 Massachusetts legislature
 2021–2022 Massachusetts legislature

References

People from West Springfield, Massachusetts
Massachusetts College of Liberal Arts alumni
Living people
Democratic Party members of the Massachusetts House of Representatives
Massachusetts city council members
21st-century American politicians
1970 births